The Cudgewa railway line is a closed railway line in the north-east of Victoria, Australia. Branching off the main North East line at Wodonga it ran east to a final terminus at Cudgewa. The High Country Rail Trail now uses most of the railway reserve.

History
The Cudgewa line opened in stages between 1889 and 1921. The first section from Wodonga to Huon opened on 10 September 1889. It was extended to Bolga on 18 July 1890, Tallangatta on 24 July 1891, Shelley on 13 June 1916 (the highest station in Victoria), Beetoomba on 10 April 1919 and Cudgewa on 5 May 1921.

In 1919, the line was used to carry materials for the construction of Hume Weir, and three years later a spur line connecting Ebden to the weir was opened.

Part of the line was converted to dual gauge in 1944 to serve freight depots around Bandiana. In the early 1950s, the volume of Hume Reservoir was increased, with the railway around Tallangatta relocated to avoid the rising waters. In the 1960s, Cudgewa became the railhead of materials for the Snowy Mountains Scheme. The line had 1 in 30 grades, with T class T413 becoming the regular diesel locomotive on the line after purchase in 1967, as it was the only locomotive of the class with dynamic brakes.

The last passenger service from Wodonga to Tallangatta ran on 30 September 1961 with a 102hp Walker railmotor. On 21 April 1978, the last regular goods train ran, with closure of the line on 1 March 1981, except for the short section to Bandiana. From 1995, it was a standard gauge track only. The Wodonga-Bandiana section closed on 1 September 2009 as part of the Wodonga Rail Bypass project. The section of the line between Wodonga and Tallangatta has now been converted into the High Country Rail Trail. On 20 October 2012, a new bridge opened over Lake Hume using the existing piers.

References

External links
Photos during Victorian Railways operations
Photos of the remains of the line:  and 
High Country Rail Trail

Closed regional railway lines in Victoria (Australia)
Railway lines opened in 1921
Railway lines closed in 1981
Snowy Mountains Scheme
Transport in Hume (region)
Shire of Towong